SS Ruahine was a UK-built ocean liner and refrigerated cargo ship. She was launched in 1909 in Scotland for the New Zealand Shipping Company, who operated her in scheduled service between Britain and New Zealand. She survived both World wars.

In 1949 she was sold to Fratelli Grimaldi of Italy, who renamed her Auriga. She was scrapped in 1957.

She was the second of three NZ Shipping Co ships called Ruahine. The first was a steamship that was launched in 1891, sold and renamed in 1900 and scrapped in 1945. The third was the motor ship  that was launched in 1950, sold in 1967, renamed in 1968 and scrapped in 1974.

Building
William Denny and Brothers built Ruahine at Dumbarton. She was launched on 19 August 1909 and completed on 6 November.

Ruahine had twin screws driven by twin triple-expansion steam engines.

As built, Ruahine had berths for 520 passengers divided into three classes.

Denny's followed Ruahine with two sister ships for the New Zealand Shipping Company:  launched in 1910 and Remuera launched in 1911.

Service
Ruahine entered service for the New Zealand Shipping Company in 1910, sailing from London to Auckland and Wellington. Her primary passenger traffic was emigrants from Britain to New Zealand. Her cargo was finished goods to New Zealand and raw foods to Britain.

Ruahine was refitted in 1926 with reduced passenger accommodation, and again in 1933 with 220 tourist class berths.

By 1930 Ruahine had wireless direction finding equipment. In 1934 the call sign GLYM superseded Ruahines code letters HPVS. By 1935 she was fitted with an echo sounding device.

On 4 February 1938 Ruahine was involved in a collision with the Royal Fleet Auxiliary tanker , which was on sea trials in the Firth of Clyde.

From 1938 Ruahine ceased carrying passengers. From May 1938 until October 1939 she was laid up in the River Fal.

In 1949 Fratelli Grimaldi bought Ruahine, renamed her Auriga, and had her refitted to carry 800 passengers. She operated on emigrant routes from Italy and France. She was scrapped in 1957 at Savona in Italy.

References

1909 ships
Ships of the New Zealand Shipping Company
Ocean liners of the United Kingdom
Passenger ships of Italy
Ships built on the River Clyde
Steamships of the United Kingdom
Steamships of Italy
World War I passenger ships of the United Kingdom
World War II merchant ships of the United Kingdom